Kazan Helicopters, Joint Stock Company is a Russian helicopter manufacturing company based at Kazan, Republic of Tatarstan. It is one of the largest helicopter manufacturers in the world.

Its products include the Mil Mi-8 and Mil Mi-17 helicopters. It is the only producer of the military version of the Mi-17 helicopter. It also produces Mil Mi-38 helicopters, as well as its own models, the Kazan Ansat and Kazan Aktai.

History
Kazan Helicopter plant was founded on September 4, 1940. It launched production of Mi-1 helicopters in 1951; it was the first serial production of helicopters in USSR. The plant has produced the first national exported helicopter – Mi-4, and the most popular helicopter – Mi-8. The total flight time of helicopters made by Kazan Helicopters exceeds 50 million hours. Kazan Helicopters has delivered over 12000 Mi-4, Mi-8, Mi-24, Mi-17, Ansat helicopters (and their modifications) to 100 countries of the world.

Products

References

External links

 [http://www.russianhelicopters.aero/en/ Official website]
 Photo gallery of production

Russian Helicopters
Helicopter manufacturers of the Soviet Union
Companies based in Kazan
Russian brands
Soviet brands
Companies formerly listed on the Moscow Exchange